Vadodara Institute Of Engineering, Kotambi. {established in June 2009, with approval (LOA No. 06/01/GUJ/ENGG/2009/23, dated 30-06-2009) from All India Council for Technical Education (AICTE), New Delhi.} is a newly established engineering college in Kotambi, Gujarat, India, affiliated to Gujarat Technological University in order to provide education to Engineering aspirants. It was established in 2009 with four primary engineering branches, Electronics and Communication, Electrical Engineering, Computer Engineering and Information technology.

Vadodara Institute of Engineering is located at Halol toll road, 19 km away from Vadodara railway Station.  It has a large campus of around 31 acres. The college aims to be short listed in top institutions of country. This College also offers GD/PI training to students in order to make them employable. All the faculties from this college are post graduated from renowned institutes like MSU and NITs.

The college is controlled by The Vadodara Institute of Education & Research Trust.

Principal
Dr.Jayesh Kumar Patel is principal of the institute. He obtained his Doctoral Degree in Civil Engineering from Maharaja Sayajirao University of Baroda in 2007. He did his post graduation & graduation in Civil Engineering at Water Resources Engineering and Management Institute, M. S. University of Baroda in 1995 and 1993 respectively. He was invited to deliver an Expert Lecture on "Managing Irrigation Potential - Issues & Challenges” at Wessex Institute of Technology in 2005. Dr. Patel was appointed as an expert for developing Waste Management Tool by Indian Institute of Technology Delhi in 2001. He presented research papers in conferences organized by I.I.T (Bombay), I.I.T. (Rookee), CBIP (New Delhi), WALMI (Bhopal), GWP (Pune), WIT (Portugal), CWWA (Canada), IIT (Kanpur) and other renowned organizations.

Degree programmes offered
 Computer Engineering   (120+6* seats)
 Electrical Engineering (120+6* seats)
 Information technology (060+3* seats)
 Mechanical Engineering (120+6* seats)
 Civil Engineering      (060+3* seats)

- Mechanical Engineering-2nd Shift (60+3* seats)
- Electrical Engineering-2nd Shift (60+3* seats)

{*Additional intake Tuition Fee Waiver scheme (TFWS)}

External links 
 Official website

Universities and colleges in Vadodara
Engineering colleges in Gujarat